Pat Cougevan (born July 13, 1971) is a lacrosse player for the Rochester Knighthawks in the National Lacrosse League. In 2007, he was named the team's "Comeback Player of the Year" after suffering a season-ending injury in the 2006 season.

Cougevan has a master's degree in Business Administration from Alfred University and is married.

Statistics

NLL

References
 Bio at Rochester Knighthawks web site

1971 births
Living people
Rochester Knighthawks players
American lacrosse players
Alfred University alumni